Enrico Valentini (born 20 February 1989) is a German professional footballer who plays for 2. Bundesliga side 1. FC Nürnberg.

Career
Valentini was released by 1. FC Nürnberg II on 29 May 2010 and signed for VfR Aalen.

On 9 February 2014, he signed a three-year contract with Karlsruher SC to join them in July.

Career statistics

References

External links
 
 
 

1989 births
Living people
German sportspeople of Italian descent
German footballers
1. FC Nürnberg II players
VfR Aalen players
Karlsruher SC players
1. FC Nürnberg players
2. Bundesliga players
3. Liga players
Footballers from Nuremberg
Association football fullbacks
Bundesliga players